This is a list of people from Hawkhurst, Kent, England.

Born in Hawkhurst
George Goschen (1866–1952), Member of Parliament, Governor of Madras and Acting Viceroy of India from 1929 to 1931.
Rod Kedward (born 1937), historian.
Nathaniel Lardner (1684–1768), theologian.
John Leaney (chr, 1790), cricketer.
William Leaney, cricketer.
Tim Richmond (born 1959), photographer
Charles Willis (1827–1895), cricketer.

Old Marlboroughians
These people attended Marlborough House School.
Wilbert Awdry (1911–1997), clergyman and author.
David Gower (born 1957), cricketer.
Stephen Poliakoff (born 1952), playwright.
Peter Vansittart (1920–2008), novelist.

Old Ronians
These people attended St Ronan's School during the time it has been based in Hawkhurst (since 1946).
Raymond Bonham Carter (1929–2004), banker.
Nick Brown (born 1950), MP.
Richard Bridgeman (born 1947), peer and restaurateur.
Frank Gardner (born 1961), journalist.
Philip Langridge (1939–2010), musician.
John Palmer (born 1940), hereditary peer

People connected with Hawkhurst
These people have a connection with Hawkhurst
William Angliss (1865–1957), businessman, was educated in Hawkhurst.
Edward Crankshaw (1909–1984), writer, lived in Hawkhurst at the time of his death.
Thomas Dunk (died 1718), Sheriff of London in 1711, lived in Hawkhurst.
John Herschel (1792–1871), astronomer, lived in Hawkhurst at the time of his death.
George Kilburne, (1839–1924) artist, was educated in Hawkhurst.
John Mayers (1801–1865), cricketer, lived in Hawkhurst at the time of his death.
William Penn, (1644–1718), founder of the Province of Pennsylvania, now the American State of Pennsylvania, owned an ironworks at Hawkhurst.
William Rootes (1894–1964), established Rootes Motors in 1909 in Hawkhurst.
Alexander Tolmer, (1815–1890), was educated in Hawkhurst and became a police officer in Australia.
 The Hawkhurst Gang, smugglers active from 1735 to 1749, were named after the village. They were based at the Oak and Ivy Inn.

 
Hawkhurst